Pamela Nisbet is a Canadian/New Zealand North American champion bridge player. Pamela has dual Canadian/New Zealand citizenship and has represented Canada many times in international competition.

Bridge accomplishments

Wins
 North American Bridge Championships (1)
 Whitehead Women's Pairs (1) 2022

Personal life
Pamela was born in New Zealand. She is the daughter of William Oswald Adam and Evelyn Mary Guilford. She is one of six children. Her father was the oldest of thirteen and left school at 10 and became a hairdresser and tobacconist.

Pamela left New Zealand to move to Canada and became a Canadian citizen. She moved back to Dunedin, New Zealand in 2021.

Pamela is divorced and has two grown daughters.

References

Canadian contract bridge players
Living people
1953 births